Rupa Kumari Saini (born 2 September 1954) is an Indian field hockey player. She competed in the women's tournament at the 1980 Summer Olympics. She is a member of the Saini Sisters hockey family.

References

External links
 

1954 births
Living people
People from Faridkot, Punjab
Field hockey players from Punjab, India
Indian female field hockey players
Olympic field hockey players of India
Field hockey players at the 1980 Summer Olympics
Place of birth missing (living people)